The Vchelka waterfall is located on the Gnylopiat' River in the Zhytomyr Raion, Zhytomyr Oblast, Ukraine, between the villages of Singury, Golovenka and Perlyavka.

See also
 Waterfalls of Ukraine

External links
 YouTube video of the river

References 

Geography of Zhytomyr Oblast
Waterfalls of Ukraine